"Pusong Ligaw" is a single by Filipino singer and actor Jericho Rosales. The song was written by Rosales and was released on January 11, 2010 under the Star Records label. The song is included in his 2009 album, Change.

Track listing

Chart performance

Weekly charts

Michael Pangilinan version

In 2015, Filipino singer Michael Pangilinan recorded and released his version of Pusong Ligaw for the television series, Bridges of Love. One of the leading actors of the said television series is Jericho Rosales, the composer and the original recording artist of the song.

Track listing

Jona version

In 2017, the song was again recorded this time by Jona for her 2017 self-titled album (after changing her screen name from Jonalyn Viray to Jona). Just like the version of Michael Pangilinan, Jona's version was also used as the theme song of the 2017 television series of the same name.

Chart performance

Weekly charts (Jona version)

Year-End charts (Jona version)

References

2009 songs
2009 singles
2015 singles
2017 singles
Tagalog-language songs